Inland Lake Provincial Park is a provincial park in British Columbia, Canada, located on the southeast side of Powell Lake, just to the northeast of the city of Powell River in that province's northern Sunshine Coast region.  Inland Lake is located between the south end of Powell Lake (W) and Haslam Lake (E).

References

Sunshine Coast (British Columbia)
Provincial parks of British Columbia
Lakes of British Columbia
2000 establishments in British Columbia
Protected areas established in 2000